Édouard Lock (born March 3, 1954 in Morocco) is a Canadian dance choreographer and the founder of the Canadian dance group, La La La Human Steps.

Career 
La La La Human Steps Founder, Artistic Director and Choreographer Édouard Lock began his choreographic career at the age of 20 and founded La La La Human Steps in 1980. Over the years Mr. Lock has been invited to create works for some of the world's leading dance companies, including the Paris Opera Ballet, the Het Nationale Ballet of Holland, The Nederlands Dans Theater, the Cullberg Ballet and the Royal Ballet of Flanders.

At the invitation of Robert Carson and the Paris Opera, Mr. Lock choreographed "Les Boréades" composed by Rameau and performed by his company LHS at Le Palais Garnier.

Collaborations
Édouard Lock has also worked with several figures in the world of music. He created a choreographed event with David Bowie and Louise Lecavalier as part of the 40th anniversary celebrations of the Institute of Contemporary Arts, filmed by video artist Nam June Paik, then continued his collaboration with Bowie in 1990 as creator and art director of his Sound + Vision world tour. In 1992. he worked with Frank Zappa on the performance of Yellow Shark,  alongside the Ensemble Modern, the Frankfurt Alte Oper, the Berlin Philharmonic and the Vienna Konzerthaus.  He also commissioned works from and collaborated with Iggy Pop, Einstürzende Neubauten (Blixa Bargeld, Marc Chung, F. M. Einheit), Shellac of North America (Steve Albini), Skinny Puppy, My Bloody Valentine (Kevin Shields) David Van Tiegham, West India Company (Stephen Luscombe, Pandit Dinesh). He has also worked with American composer and Pulitzer Award winner David Lang for Salt (1997) and Amelia (2002) and with British composer Gavin Bryars, for 2, Amjad, and New Work.

Other Activities
Various films have been made on Mr. Lock's work including Le Petit Musée de Vélasquez directed by Bernar Hébert, and the documentary Inspirations by British director Michael Apted, which also included Roy Lichtenstein, Tadao Ando and David Bowie amongst others.

Recognition
His works have garnered many awards, including the Chalmers choreographic prize, the New York Dance and Performance Award, the Prix Denise-Pelletier, the National Arts Centre Award, the Benois de la Danse choreographic award given in Moscow, the Governor General's Performing Arts Award, the Premio Positano Leonide Massine Award, The Molson Prize given by the Canada Council for the Arts and an honorary doctorate granted by the Université du Québec.

The film adaptation of Amelia, directed by Edouard Lock, had its American premiere at the 2004 Tribeca Film Festival and its European premiere at the Karlovy Vary International Film Festival. The film won its category at the Chicago International Film Festival, the Prague International Film Festival and the Rose d'Or Festival in Switzerland as well as winning two I.C.E. and two Gemini Awards for best direction and best editing.

Mr. Lock was named a Chevalier de l'Ordre national du Québec and Officer of the Order of Canada

1982 : National Jean A. Chalmers Choreography Award (Oranges 1982) 
1986 : Bessie Award (New-York)
2001 : Knight of the National Order of Quebec
2001 : Governor General's National Arts Centre Award 
2001 : National Arts Centre Award
2001 : Jean A. Chalmers National Dance Award (Exaucé / Salt) 
2002 : Prix Denise-Pelletier
2003 : Prix Benois de la Danse
2004 : Gemini Awards
2006 : Fellow of the Royal Society of Canada
2010 : Governor General's Performing Arts Award
2010 : Molson Prize
2010 : Officer of the Order of Canada
2010 : Doctor honoris causa, Université du Québec à Montréal
2011 : Prix Premio Positano Leonide Massine per la Danza
2012 : Prix du CALQ pour la meilleure tournée internationale
2015 : Le Grand Prix de la Danse (The Seasons 2015)

Works
1976 : Temps volé
1977 : La Maison de ma mère
1977 : Remous
1978 : Le Nageur
1980 : Lily Marlène dans la jungle, Western
1981 : Oranges ou la Recherche du paradis perdu
1983 : Businessman in the Process of Becoming an Angel
1985 : Human Sex
1987 : New Demons - La belle et la bête
1988 : Bread Dances for Het Nationale Ballet
1990 : Infante, c'est destroy
1995 : 2
1996 : Étude for Les Grands Ballets Canadiens
1999 : Exaucé/Salt
2002 : Amelia, AndréAuria for Opéra national de Paris
2003 : Les Boréades for Opéra national de Paris
2007 : Amjad
2011 : Untitled/New Work/A Piece by Édouard Lock
2013 : The Seasons for São Paulo Companhia de Dança
2013 : 11th Floor for The Cullberg Ballet
2014 : Reprise AndréAuria for Opéra national de Paris
2014 : Creation for LA LA LA Human Steps contemporary arts - exhibition at the Boijmans Museum Rotterdam
2014 : Directed a film of The Boijmans Museum event

References

External links
 Édouard Lock at The Canadian Encyclopedia

 Archival footage of Louise Lecavalier performing Édouard Lock's A Few Minutes of Lock in 2011 at Jacob's Pillow.  
 La La La Human Steps
 Watch the 2010 short documentary Lock at the National Film Board of Canada

1954 births
Living people
Canadian choreographers
Fellows of the Royal Society of Canada
Knights of the National Order of Quebec
Officers of the Order of Canada
Prix Denise-Pelletier winners
Concordia University alumni
Governor General's Performing Arts Award winners
Bessie Award winners